Doctor Psycho is a fictional character appearing in DC Comics publications and related media, commonly as a recurring adversary of the superhero Wonder Woman. First appearing in Wonder Woman, issue #5 (1943), written by Wonder Woman creator William Moulton Marston, the character would become one of the Amazing Amazon's most persistent enemies, reappearing throughout the Golden, Silver, Bronze, and Modern Age of Comics.

Over the decades, Dr. Psycho has undergone several minor updates as comics continuities have shifted and evolved, though his distinctive physical appearance has remained largely faithful to artist Harry G. Peter's original 1943 design. After DC Comics rebooted its continuity in 1985 (in a publication event known as the Crisis on Infinite Earths), Wonder Woman, her supporting characters and many of her foes, were re-imagined and reintroduced. Prior to this reboot, Doctor Psycho demonstrated a command over the occult and was able to harness supernatural energies to project illusions. Since his Post-Crisis reintroduction, the character has been presented as an extremely powerful telepath and telekinetic. Despite these changes, Doctor Psycho has consistently been portrayed as a misogynistic person of short stature who suffers from mental illness (ranging from mild obsessiveness to full-blown dissociation).

Doctor Psycho made his animation debut as a regular in Harley Quinn, voiced by Tony Hale.

Background
The character of Doctor Psycho was created by William Moulton Marston, creator of Wonder Woman and author of her original adventures, as an allegory of the folly of abnormal emotions such as misogyny and other hatreds, as well as to be another embodiment of what he called "less actively developed men" (emotionally misaligned) who needed emotional reform by a love leader (Wonder Woman).   William Moulton Marston's creation of Doctor Psycho drew upon his interest in metaphysics and spiritualism.  Marston, a psychologist, created Doctor Psycho as a murderous psychopath with an intense hatred of women. The character was partly inspired by actor Lon Chaney ("Man of a thousand faces") and partly by Marston's undergraduate advisor Hugo Münsterberg, who was opposed to women's suffrage and feminism, and was into metaphysics. Doctor Psycho was also one of several villains created for Wonder Woman who were occultists, beguiling the masses for their own self-enriching purposes.

As Wonder Woman's rogues and supporting cast were largely jettisoned during the period that Robert Kanigher wrote and edited the issues, Doctor Psycho remained one of the few villains to appear in the Golden, Silver, and Bronze Age adventures. The character was also one of the few such villains to be modernized in the early issues of the post-Crisis on Infinite Earths Wonder Woman.

Fictional character biography

Pre-Crisis
Doctor Psycho first appears as a pawn of the Duke of Deception. God of War, Mars, enraged that women were gaining power in Earth society and potentially threatening his ability to engulf the world in war, ordered Deception to discredit women. Deception called upon Doctor Psycho to set about eliminating women from the war effort.

Doctor Psycho, known as Cyril Psycho was revealed in flashback to have been a medical student who was frequently humiliated by his peers. He discovered that his fiancée Marva Jane Gray was in love with college athletic champion Ben Bradley. Bradley removed him as a rival for Marva's affections by stealing $125,000 worth of radium from the college lab and hunching down in disguise so that Marva would think she saw her diminutive fiancé as the culprit.

Convicted on the basis of Marva's testimony, Psycho seethed behind bars for years, planning his revenge while developing an intense hatred of all women. Upon his release, he tortured and killed Bradley, who falsely confessed that Marva was his willing accomplice. Psycho then kidnapped and tortured Marva, hypnotically compelling her to marry him, and then subjecting her to daily occult experiments.

Learning that he could use Marva as a medium for summoning ectoplasm he could use at will to fashion and animate human forms around his own misshapen body, he created a new career for himself as an occultist and sham psychic who developed a following of millions.

At Deception's urging, he used his fame as an occultist to campaign for eliminating women from the war effort by creating an ectoplasmic form purporting to be the spirit of George Washington, claiming that women were hindering the war effort. He also disguised himself as Colonel Darnell of Military Intelligence to frame female staff of military intelligence for espionage.

With the aid of Steve Trevor and the Holliday College girls, Wonder Woman disrupted his plot but was forced to let him go, unable to prove any of his crimes in a court of law. Doctor Psycho fixated his pathological hatred of women into fantasies of revenge against Wonder Woman.

Freed from Psycho's influence, Marva joined the WAACs and helped Wonder Woman expose Nazi saboteur Stoffer, who had disguised himself as General Scott.

Psycho was eventually imprisoned but escaped by faking his own death, kidnapping Marva and then his former secretary, Joan White, to use as mediums for his ectoplasmic power. He attempted to court Etta Candy in a disguise, but his cover was blown by Etta's suitor Oscar Sweetgulper and he was returned to prison.

In the Golden Age, Psycho's brother Ironsides was a brilliant geologist who was also a villain. Ironsides invented the Iron Giant's disguise. He did not, however, display any superpowers.

Psycho eventually realized that he could use Steve Trevor as a medium. Kidnapping Trevor, he fashioned an ectoplasmic dream of power from Trevor's unconscious mind and became the powerful "Captain Wonder", who teamed up with the Silver Swan to destroy Wonder Woman. His powerful form was destroyed when Trevor awakened from his slumber.

When the Monitor was testing heroes and villains in the run-up to the Crisis on Infinite Earths, he set up Doctor Psycho to retrieve ectoplasmic machinery from military intelligence and to fight with several of Wonder Woman's other rogues, but they were defeated by the combined might of Wonder Woman and Etta Candy, who used the ectoplasm machine to create a superpowered version of herself patterned after Wonder Woman.

Post-Crisis
Post-Crisis Dr. Psycho is introduced as Edgar Cizko, a telepath with the ability to enter and sometimes shape other people's dreams. Psycho was enlisted by Circe to create disturbing dreams for Wonder Woman's close friend, Vanessa Kapatelis, with the result that Wonder Woman would be forced to separate herself from her closest allies. This was part of a plot intended to leave Wonder Woman isolated and create widespread public fear of her fellow Amazons. Psycho later helps warp Kapatelis' damaged psyche to turn her into the new Silver Swan.

Dr. Psycho's plans are foiled and he subsequently spends some time as a patient in a mental facility, confined to a padded room and a straitjacket. Several members of the time-lost Legion of Super-Heroes were in telepathic range. When Saturn Girl mentally shouts for a lost member, this awakened Dr. Psycho enough for him to attack several staff members and flee. The call brought him to the Legion, whom he also attacks.

In the Villains United miniseries leading up to Infinite Crisis, Psycho has surfaced as a core member of Lex Luthor's Secret Society of Super Villains. Working with Talia al Ghul, he recruits many supervillains for the Society, and is rejected and successfully rebuffed by Catman. He threatens to have Catman kill himself. The presence of the man's loyal pack of lions convinces Psycho that he might be eaten if he forces Catman to harm himself. This rejection angers him, causing much grumbling for some time afterwards. He also spends time working with Deathstroke to capture one of the Marvel Family. Other members of the Society realize that Psycho is trying to mentally influence them. Unaffected, they brush it off as something to be expected.

After the events of the 6th issue of Infinite Crisis, Psycho travels with Warp to free Doomsday from captivity near the center of the Earth. He takes control of Doomsday, and uses him to spearhead a supervillain assault on Metropolis. The villains lose this battle.

One Year Later, Doctor Psycho is arrested and put on trial with Kate Spencer (Manhunter) as his defense attorney. Following his arrest, he is abandoned by the Society. During the trial, he uses his mind-controlling abilities to make Spencer dream of herself dressed as Wonder Woman in a scene reminiscent of the Roman Colosseum. Before the trial verdict could be revealed, his powers are returned to him as a result of his ties to the Society who had constructed the machine that was blocking them. He uses his telepathy to hold the people in the courtroom hostage.

This forces Spencer to try to put on her uniform but she instead reveals herself to Doctor Psycho as Manhunter. Psycho then makes Kate put on her suit, but drops his guard to sneak a kiss with her, resulting in him being stabbed in the stomach and head. This causes him to forget about Kate's alter-ego and lose his powers.

Doctor Psycho has lately been shown still in a position of authority with the Society in the Secret Six miniseries. He has been working with former enemy Cheshire for Vandal Savage and hiring various villains to put out hits on other Secret Six members. In the final issue of Secret Six (December 2006), he is stabbed repeatedly and seriously injured by the Mad Hatter.

He resurfaced with his powers restored and amplified by Circe in the Wonder Woman series beginning in 2006. He was assisting Cheetah and Giganta.

On the cover of Justice League of America vol. 2 #13, it shows Doctor Psycho as a member of the latest Injustice League.

During the Final Crisis storyline, Genocide was sent to the DMA (Department of Metahuman Affairs) Headquarters to retrieve Doctor Psycho, who is held captive there.

The New 52
In September 2011, The New 52 rebooted DC's continuity. In this new timeline, Doctor Psycho first appears in Superboy; a con man psychic who practices seance, using his telepathy to steal identities of customers in Manhattan. The purpose of this guise is to hide from the H.I.V.E., who are hunting those with telepathic abilities. He first encounters Superboy after hearing about aliens in the city. His astral form is unintentionally pulled into Superboy's mind, who is fighting Plasmus.

After learning of Superboy's origin, which remains unknown to Superboy, he attempts to befriend him. The two are attacked by agents of H.I.V.E, which they defeat. They form an alliance against the organization. During their investigation, they run into a girl with psionic powers named Sarah, her powers manifest into a being called Decay; she had been previously experimented on by the H.I.V.E.

He later appears in Teen Titans vol. 4 #11, where he is on the Metropolis prison talking with Psimon. Then he appears in Teen Titans vol. 4 #13, where he is trying to get Raven's powers, but he accidentally looks into her mind, where he sees her killing him.

Later during the "Trinity War" storyline, Question gives Superman a newspaper clipping stating that Doctor Psycho was sighted in Khandaq the day when Doctor Light was killed. This causes Superman, Question, and the Justice League to go after Doctor Psycho. Superman, Question, and the others arrive in Pittsburgh to confront Doctor Psycho. Martian Manhunter looks into Doctor Psycho's mind and learns that he was sent to Kahndaq by the Secret Society, but did not do anything to control Superman's mind.

During the "Forever Evil" storyline, Doctor Psycho is among the villains recruited by the Crime Syndicate to join the Secret Society of Super Villains. Then he appears in Justice League vol. 2 #29, where he is sent by the Society, along with the Fearsome Five and Hector Hammond, to fight against Cyborg and the Metal Men. He ends up being defeated by Gold.

DC Rebirth
After the events of DC Rebirth, Doctor Psycho's history had been altered. Using his illusions to pose as a scientist for A.R.G.U.S. named Dr. Edward Carne, Doctor Psycho was first seen after Vanessa Kapatelis was defeated and brought into custody by Wonder Woman. As Doctor Carne, Psycho told Wonder Woman that when Vanessa woke from her comatose state that he would be there for her.

Doctor Psycho later appeared as a member of the Cabal alongside Per Degaton, Queen Bee, Amazo, and Hugo Strange.

Later, Doctor Psycho was one of several powerful psychics kidnapped by Amanda Waller to hack into Brainiac's mind.

In the Watchmen sequel Doomsday Clock, Doctor Psycho is among the villains that attend an underground meeting held by the Riddler, where they talk about the Superman Theory.

Powers and abilities
Doctor Psycho is a skilled occultist and utilizes psionic powers to traumatize or terrify those who stand in his way. In two original appearances, he hypnotizes his victims to draw ectoplasm into the physical world, which Psycho shaped into various disguises.

In The New 52 continuity, Doctor Psycho possesses psychokinetic capabilities, although Edgar has stated that he had possessed every one of them imaginable. However, he does not have the enough energy required to use his abilities in their fullest capacity. He can overcome this weakness by siphoning mental energies from other psychic individuals, such as Superboy.

Other versions

Wonder Woman: Earth One
Doctor Psycho appears as a primary antagonist in the second volume of Wonder Woman: Earth One by writer Grant Morrison and artist Yanick Paquette. This version of the character is of average height and named Dr. Leon Zeiko, a hypnotist and pick-up artist who manipulates Wonder Woman.

In other media

Television
 Doctor Psycho appears in the Powerless episode "Emergency Punch-Up", portrayed by an uncredited Ronnie Zappa.
 Doctor Psycho appears in Harley Quinn, voiced by Tony Hale. This version is described as "an angry misogynist dwarf with telekinesis". Additionally, he suffers from a Napoleon complex, which stemmed from not being able to ride a Ferris wheel due to his short stature as a child. He also reportedly became a villain after the Ferris wheel collapsed and he realized he enjoyed seeing people suffer. Introduced in the episode "So, You Need a Crew?", Psycho is ousted from the Legion of Doom after calling Wonder Woman and his wife Giganta the "C-word" on live television and being divorced by the latter, leading to Psycho reluctantly joining forces with Harley Quinn's crew to get back into the world of supervillainy. In the episode "You're a Damn Good Cop, Jim Gordon", Psycho and Poison Ivy seek revenge on online personality, the Cowled Critic, for slandering them, only to discover it is his son Herman, who was bitter over his father abusing him. Psycho explains that he was trying to inspire Herman to grow up to become a supervillain and admits that he is proud of his son, allowing them to reconcile. While Psycho remains by his newfound allies' side throughout most of the first two seasons, in the episode "Inner (Para) Demons", he becomes furious with Harley after she gains control of a Parademon army, only to relinquish them soon after, and quits the crew so he can seek revenge against her and conquer the Earth himself, starting with Gotham City. In the episode "Dye Hard", Psycho forms a partnership with the Riddler to steal a mind control helmet to enhance the former's powers and allow him to enslave the Parademons that Harley left behind as well as most of Harley's crew. He later strikes a deal with Darkseid to kill Harley in exchange for an army large enough to take over the world, though his plans are ultimately foiled by Harley, Ivy, and the Justice League and he is subsequently sent to Arkham Asylum by the season two finale, "Something Borrowed, Something Green". By the season three episode "Batman Begins Forever", Psycho has learned to better control his emotions thanks to the recently-elected Mayor Joker's rehabilitation program and has started an anger-management podcast that he runs from within his cell. He is broken out by Harley and Ivy to help find the latter's sentient plant, Frank, only to be captured alongside them by the Bat-Family and later turned into a zombie tree amidst a plant zombie apocalypse inadvertently caused by Bruce Wayne, though Psycho is eventually returned to normal.

Video games
 Doctor Psycho appears in DC Universe Online. This version is a member of the Secret Society of Super Villains who runs a LexCorp-funded experimental facility within Metropolis General Hospital. In the villain campaign, the players help him capture Supergirl so he can study her DNA on Lex Luthor's behalf. In the hero campaign, the heroes defeat Psycho and rescue Supergirl.
 Doctor Psycho appears as an assist character in Scribblenauts Unmasked: A DC Comics Adventure.

Miscellaneous
 Doctor Psycho appears in Dr. Psycho's Circus of Crime, by Paul Kupperberg and published by Capstone as part of their DC Super Heroes line of illustrated children's books.
 Doctor Psycho appears in a flashback depicted in issue #54 of Teen Titans Go!.
 Doctor Psycho appears in issue #4 of All-New Batman: The Brave and the Bold. He and several Wonder Woman villains join forces with an assortment of Batman villains to crash their respective enemies' wedding, but are swiftly defeated by the Justice League and the Amazons of Themyscira.
 Doctor Psycho appears in Wonder Woman '77. This version possesses telepathic machines and is imprisoned in a mental institution.
 An alternate universe incarnation of Doctor Psycho appears in issue #2 of the Justice League: Gods and Monsters tie-in comics. This version is Dr. Jackson Alpert, a former member of the CIA's MKUltra program who disagreed with his superiors and conducted experiments on unwilling and unaware subjects using psychotropic drugs so he could "set them free" and bring them to the next stage of human evolution instead. After leaving the CIA, Alpert traveled to New York to continue his experiments, turning his subjects into wild, violent creatures in the process. After acquiring Bekka / Wonder Woman's Mother Box's crystal gems, Alpert accelerated his research, founded the Eternity Institute in Switzerland, became a recluse, developed extraordinary advances in science, medicine, and technology, and secretly harvested the Justice League's DNA over the course of the next 40 years. Additionally, he created the Forever People as a result of his efforts to further develop humanity and lead them to a new world of peace and order. In his dying years, he evolves into Imperiex using the League's DNA and the Forever Formula, but is killed by Bekka.

See also
 List of Wonder Woman enemies

References

Characters created by William Moulton Marston
Comics characters introduced in 1943
DC Comics characters who have mental powers
DC Comics metahumans
DC Comics male supervillains
DC Comics telekinetics
DC Comics telepaths
Fictional characters with dwarfism
Fictional characters with energy-manipulation abilities
Fictional hypnotists and indoctrinators
Fictional illusionists
Fictional physicians
Golden Age supervillains
Wonder Woman characters
Characters created by H. G. Peter
Astral projection in popular culture